Syed Muhammad Ishaq (1915–1977) was a Bangladeshi Islamic scholar, author, mufassir, debator and educationist. He was a disciple of Muhammad Ibrahim of Ujani. Ishaq was the inaugural Pir Saheb of Charmonai, having founded the Charmonai Darbar Sharif and Jamia Rashidia Ahsanabad in 1924, one of the largest Islamic institutions in South Bengal. He was succeeded by his son, Syed Fazlul Karim, and became posthumously known by his followers as Dada Huzur.

Early life and family 
Ishaq was born in 1915 to a Bengali Muslim family of Syeds in the village of Pashurikathi in Char Monai, located to the east of the Kirtankhola river in Backergunge District, Bengal Province. His father, Syed Amjad Ali, traced his lineage to Ali, the fourth Caliph of Islam. His great great grandfather, Syed Ali Akbar, migrated from Baghdad to Bengal, settling in the village of Pashurikathi in Barisal. Akbar's younger brother, Syed Ali Asghar, founded the Syed family of Laktia, located west of the Kirtankhola.

Education
Ishaq started his primary education under his uncle Syed Muhammad Abdul Jabbar of Charmonai. He then became a student of Muhammad Ibrahim of Ujani at the Jamia Islamia Ibrahimia in Kachua, Chandpur, where he furthered his Qur'anic studies. After completing the seven qira'at under his teacher, he enrolled at the Bhola Darul Hadith Alia Madrasa in Bhola Island where he passed his jamat-e-ula. Ishaq then moved to India to study at the Darul Uloom Deoband seminary in Saharanpur.

Career 
After returning to Bengal, Ishaq dedicated his life to teaching the Islamic sciences. In 1932, he founded the Charmonai Ahsanabad Rashidia Madrasa and Lillah Boarding (Orphanage) from his own home. It was named after his uncle Syed Ahsan and the Deobandi jurist Rashid Ahmad Gangohi respectively. He independently taught the Dars-i Nizami syllabus, before retiring in 1947. After 1947, through the efforts of Muhammad Esmatullah and his son-in-law Delwar Husain, the institution became an alia madrasa. Among his students were Syed Fazlul Karim, Muhammad Abul Bashar of Shahtali and Azharul Islam Siddiqi of Manikganj.

Ishaq was a supporter of Bangladeshi independence. During the Bangladesh Liberation War of 1971, Mohammad Abdul Jalil (commander of Sector 9), Captain Abdul Latif and other Barisali freedom fighters would seek advice and duas from Muhammad Ishaq in Charmonai. His institution, Jamia Rashidia Ahsanabad, became a base for Bengali freedom fighters where they would stay and return from battles. The institution provided two large rooms for the freedom fighters to use and accommodated for them. For the entirety of the nine-month war, several government officials based in Barisal would shelter themselves with their families at the Charmonai Madrasa.

Works 
Ahmad was written 27 books:

 Amparar Tafsir
 Untrish Parar Tafsir
 Sura Yasin Sharifer Tafsir
 Sura ar-Rahman Sharifer Tafsir
 Beheshter Shukh
 Dozakher Dukh
 Asheq-e-Mashuq
 Bhed-e-Marefat
 Marefate-Haq ba Talim-e-Zikr
 Hazrat Bara Qari Ibrahim Saheber Jiboni
 Khas Parda ba Shamir Khedmot
 Namaz Shikkha
 Dhoom Binash ba Dil Pak
 Tabizer Kitab
 Jihade Islam
 Pir Hoiya Abar Kafer Hoy Keno?
 Hadiyyatul Islamia (Calendar)
 Faridpure Birat Bahas
 Noakhalir Birat Bahas
 Nuzhatul Qarir Sharal Byakhya
 Eshq-e-Dewan ba Premer Gazal
 Rah-e-Jannat 116 Prakar Dua
 Sharshinar Sawal Charmonair Jawab
 Qabare Azab - Mastabara Azab Dekhi Na Keno?
 Jumar Namaz
 Zikr-e-Jali ba Waz Haaler Akatya Dalil
 Juktipurno Waz ba Mawlapaker Onushondhan

Personal life 
Ishaq had three wives. With Syeda Rabeya Khatun, daughter of his uncle Syed Abdul Jabbar, he had two sons (Qari Syed Mubarak Karim and Syed Fazlul Karim) and three daughters. He had one son and three daughters with his second wife, and three sons and one daughter with his third wife Amena Begum.

Death 
Ishaq died in 1977, and was buried in Charmonai.

References 

1977 deaths
1915 births
20th-century Bengalis
Bengali Muslim scholars of Islam
People from Barisal
Bengali-language writers
Bengali writers
Bangladeshi Sunni Muslim scholars of Islam
Hanafis
Bangladeshi people of Arab descent
Deobandis